The Richelsdorf Hills is the name given to a landscape in the German Central Uplands. Despite its German suffix Gebirge ("hill range") these hills are not a true hill range, but a cultural landscape. Locally this also includes the whole surrounding region in the southeast of the Fulda-Werra Uplands; parts of the county of Werra-Meißner-Kreis to the south and the extreme northwest of the Thuringian county of  Wartburgkreis are included.

References

Sources 
 Bundesamt für Naturschutz (BfN)
 Map service
 Landscape fact file: Fulda-Werra Uplands

External links 
 

Mountains and hills of Hesse
Central Uplands
Mountains and hills of Thuringia
Wartburgkreis
Hersfeld-Rotenburg
Werra-Meißner-Kreis